Acetobacterium is a genus of anaerobic, Gram-positive bacteria that belong to the Eubacteriaceae family. 
The type species of this genus is Acetobacterium woodii. The name, Acetobacterium, has originated because they are acetogens, predominantly making acetic acid as a byproduct of anaerobic metabolism. Most of the species reported in this genus are homoacetogens, i.e. solely producing acetic acid as their metabolic byproduct. They should not be confused with acetic acid bacteria which are aerobic, Gram-negative Alphaproteobacteria.

Other acetogens use the Wood–Ljungdahl pathway to reduce CO or CO2 and produce acetate, but what distinguishes A.woodii and other Acetobacterium from other acetogens is that it conserves energy by using an Rnf complex to create a sodium gradient rather than a proton gradient. This means that A.woodii would need sodium in its environment in order to make ATP.

When reducing CO2 to acetate the Acetobacterium uses the Wood–Ljungdahl pathway with CO2 as the electron acceptor. However, the Acetobacterium can use other electron acceptors like caffeate. To use caffeate as an electron acceptor the bacterium couples hydrogen dependent caffeate reduction with electrons from hydrogen and uses sodium ions as coupling ions. The step in the electron transport chain that creates the sodium gradient is the ferredoxin-dependent reduction of NAD+.

One application of Acetobacterium, is that A. woodii could be used in the transformation of tetrachloromethane to dichloromethane and carbon dioxide by reductive dechlorinations, but the reactions taken to get to the final product are unknown. This reaction is useful because the products, CO2 and dichloromethane are less toxic than tetrachloromethane. Another application of A.woodii is that it can reduce the effects of greenhouse gases since A.woodii can be used to convert CO2 and CO into acetyl-CoA which could then be used to make other chemicals like ethanol and acetate. The production of ethanol by Acetobacterium using chemolithotrophic methods is important because ethanol can be used as a biofuel. By using the ethanol that is produced by the bacterium researchers aim to create a sustainable way to create energy.

References 

Eubacteriaceae
Bacteria genera